Linheli Subdistrict is a subdistrict located on the northwest of Tongzhou District, Beijing. It borders Yuqiao Subdistrict in its north, Yongshun and Zhangjiawan Towns in its east, Liyuan Town in its south, and Jiukeshu Subdistrict in its west.

The subdistrict was formally created on 2020.

Administrative divisions 

As of 2021, the subdistrict consisted of 10 residential communities:

See also 
 List of township-level divisions of Beijing

References 

Tongzhou District, Beijing
Subdistricts of Beijing